The World is Bennie K's fifth album.

Track listing
 Aru Asa: Opening (ある朝) (Some Morning)
 Joy Trip
 Passista de Samba
 Satisfaction
 Ei->Futsu->Doi: Interlude (英→仏→独) (Eng->Fr->Ger)
 Hooligan in the House (風利眼 in the House) The Kanjis reading would be: Fuurigan which would be the same als Hooligan
 Rararai Lie?! (ララライ Lie?!)
 1001 Nights
 Echo
 Matador Love
 Safari
 Kiro...: Interlude (帰路) (The Way Back)
 Aoi Tori (青い鳥) (Blue Bird)
 Around the World: Reprise
 Waiha (ワイハ) (Hawaii)

Charts 
Oricon Sales Chart (Japan)

References

Bennie K albums
2007 albums